Sonoma Mountain High School is one of three alternative schools in Petaluma, California. It is located on the Casa Grande High School campus. There are, on average, 32 pupils enrolled at Sonoma Mountain High School at any given time. About 6 pupils graduate every year.

References 
"Carpe Diem & Sonoma Mountain". Web. Retrieved 5 une 2019.

External links
 Official website

High schools in Sonoma County, California
Public high schools in California
Petaluma, California
Alternative schools in the United States